Annelies Maas (born 25 January 1960 in Wageningen) is a former freestyle swimmer from the Netherlands, who competed in two consecutive Summer Olympics for her native country, starting in 1976.

At her second Olympic appearance she won the bronze medal in the 4×100 m freestyle relay, alongside Conny van Bentum, Reggie de Jong and Wilma van Velsen. Her best individual finish was the fourth place in the 200 m freestyle at the Montreal Games (1976).

See also
Dutch records in swimming

References

1960 births
Living people
Olympic swimmers of the Netherlands
Swimmers at the 1976 Summer Olympics
Swimmers at the 1980 Summer Olympics
Olympic bronze medalists for the Netherlands
People from Wageningen
Sportspeople from Gelderland
Olympic bronze medalists in swimming
Medalists at the 1980 Summer Olympics
Dutch female freestyle swimmers
World Aquatics Championships medalists in swimming
European Aquatics Championships medalists in swimming
Universiade medalists in swimming
Universiade gold medalists for the Netherlands
Universiade silver medalists for the Netherlands
Universiade bronze medalists for the Netherlands
Medalists at the 1979 Summer Universiade
20th-century Dutch women